The Journal of Personality Assessment is a bimonthly peer-reviewed academic journal covering research on measurement issues in the fields of personality and clinical psychology that was established in 1936. It is published by Taylor and Francis on behalf of the Society for Personality Assessment. The editor-in-chief is Martin Sellbom (University of Otago, New Zealand), as the previous editor, Steven Huprich (University of Detroit Mercy), stepped down in 2018. According to the Journal Citation Reports, the journal has a 2018 impact factor of 2.829.

References

External links 
 

Personality journals
Bimonthly journals
Taylor & Francis academic journals
Publications established in 1936
English-language journals